Basketball Club Žalgiris is a professional basketball team that is based in Kaunas, Lithuania, and competes domestically in the Lietuvos krepšinio lyga (LKL, Lithuanian Basketball League). Founded in 1944, it is one of the oldest teams in the EuroLeague. Žalgiris is one of 11 European clubs to hold long-term licenses with the EuroLeague, which provides a guaranteed place in the regular-season phase of this league. Since the 2011–12 season, Žalgiris plays its home games in Žalgiris Arena, which was built just before EuroBasket 2011. The club's name commemorates the victorious Battle of Žalgiris (Battle of Grunwald). Both Žalgiris and Grunwald translate to "green wood".

Žalgiris has featured many Lithuanian basketball legends during its history, including Arvydas Sabonis, Modestas Paulauskas and Šarūnas Jasikevičius. Nine of the fifteen Lithuanian basketball players to play in the North American National Basketball Association (NBA) have played for Žalgiris or were part of the Žalgiris youth program at one point in their careers (Arvydas Sabonis, Šarūnas Jasikevičius, Donatas Motiejūnas, Mindaugas Kuzminskas, Darius Songaila, Martynas Andriuškevičius, Žydrūnas Ilgauskas, Arnoldas Kulboka).

The team is the most-decorated Lithuanian basketball club, having won 23 Lithuanian championships, 5 Soviet championships, 1 European championship.

History

1944–1982

Basketball Club Žalgiris was formed in 1944. First, team was named ASK (1945–47), then SKIF (1947-1949), from 1950 team was named Žalgiris. The team quickly rose to prominence, winning multiple Lithuanian basketball championships, also winning the USSR Premier Basketball League in 1947 and 1951. The team won silver medals in the 1949 and 1952 championships, and bronze in 1953, 1954, 1955 and 1956. Žalgiris also won the USSR Basketball Cup in 1953. The team at the time was led by Stepas Butautas, Vytautas Kulakauskas, Justinas Lagunavičius, Kazimieras Petkevičius, and later, by Stasys Stonkus and Algirdas Lauritėnas.

In the 1960s, the team's play declined, and many new young players joined the team, such as Modestas Paulauskas, Romualdas Venzbergas, Henrikas Giedraitis, Algirdas Linkevičius and Sergejus Jovaiša. The team won bronze medals in the Soviet Union championship in 1971, 1973 and 1978. In 1980, Žalgiris won the silver medals, and debuted in the 1980–81 FIBA European Cup Winners' Cup the next season.

1983–1987: Fame

Žalgiris became the dominant club in Soviet Union and Europe when they added new talents to the team – Valdemaras Chomičius and Rimas Kurtinaitis – and coach Vladas Garastas. Sabonis could do everything on the court: play defense, assist his teammates, shoot three-pointers, and dominate inside the paint.

During the 1980s, Žalgiris won three consecutive Soviet Union National League championships, from 1985 to 1987, beating CSKA Moscow (English: Central Sports Club of Army) in the finals. In 1985, they reached the Saporta Cup final, but lost to FC Barcelona. Despite the loss, Žalgiris participated in EuroLeague the next year as the Soviet Union champions, reaching the finals and losing to the rival Cibona. In 1986, Žalgiris won the William Jones Intercontinental Cup, defeating Dražen Petrović's Cibona Zagreb in the semi-finals and Ferro Carril Oeste in the finals. They also participated in 1987 FIBA Club World Cup. Žalgiris was emerging as one of the top clubs in Europe at the time.

In the mid-1980s, the finals between Žalgiris Kaunas and CSKA Moscow served as a major inspiration for the Lithuanian national revival, especially when they played in Kaunas Sports Hall. From this emerged the Sąjūdis national movement and the re-establishment of state independence.

1987–1989: Setbacks
In 1987, however, Žalgiris suffered a setback when star player Sabonis suffered a torn achilles tendon. Three months later, he tore it again, causing him to miss most of the 1987–88 season. That season, Žalgiris won a silver medal, losing to CSKA Moscow in the Soviet League finals. The next season, Žalgiris managed to reach the European Cup Winners' Cup semi-finals and won a silver medal in Soviet League, losing a dramatic finals to Stroitel Kiev.

Just before the start of the 1989–90 season Žalgiris lost all of its leaders and half of its team: Sabonis, Kurtinaitis, Jovaiša, Chomičius and head coach Garastas all left the club, free from the Iron Curtain that had barred Lithuanian basketball talent from becoming internationals.

1989–1997: New generation

In the 1989–90 season, Žalgiris reached the Clubs Cup Winners' Cup semi-finals, where they lost to Real Madrid. After the Act of the Re-Establishment of the State of Lithuania, Žalgiris left the USSR championship. Over the next few seasons, Žalgiris won Lithuanian championships in 1991, 1992 and 1993, and the LKF Cup in 1990. Žalgiris won the ProfBasket Cup tournament, featuring many former USSR teams, in 1992. They won their first LKL title in 1994, beating Atletas Kaunas 3–1 in a four-game series. Over the following two years, Žalgiris again dominated LKL tournaments, beating Atletas Kaunas 3–0 in 1995 and 3–2 (after being down 0–2 in the series) in 1996, and had success participating in the 1995–96 FIBA European Cup when Rimas Kurtinaitis returned to play for his home team. After finishing with a 9–3 record in the regular season, Žalgiris advanced to the semi-finals, but fell to PAOK in the two-game series. In 1997, Žalgiris again won the LKL championship, beating Olimpas Žemaitija Plungė 3–0 in the finals, and reached round 16 in the Saporta Cup, losing to Paris Basket Racing. Players including Darius Lukminas, Gintaras Einikis, Kęstutis Šeštokas, Dainius Adomaitis, and Darius Maskoliūnas played for the club during this period, coached by Jonas Kazlauskas.

1998–1999: The biggest success

Žalgiris enjoyed its greatest success as a club during the 1997–98 and 1998–99 seasons. They were coached by Jonas Kazlauskas with a new generation of Lithuanian talent including Saulius Štombergas, Dainius Adomaitis, Eurelijus Žukauskas, Tomas Masiulis, and Mindaugas Žukauskas, and experienced foreign players Franjo Arapović and Ennis Whatley. The team defeated Stefanel Milano 82–67 in the 1998 FIBA Saporta Cup final in Belgrade. Saulius Štombergas scored 35 points in the final. Žalgiris also won a fifth-consecutive LKL title, this time against Atletas Kaunas.

In the 1998–99 season Žalgiris made it to the EuroLeague Final Four for the first time in the club's history, and were crowned European champions after defeating Olympiacos and Kinder Bologna in the semi-final and the final, respectively. Tyus Edney was named EuroLeague Final Four MVP. Žalgiris also won LKL and North European Basketball League (NEBL) titles that season. They won bronze in the 1999 McDonald's Championship. The rivalry against Lietuvos rytas also began.

2000–2004: Struggles and Sabonis comeback
The year after winning the EuroLeague, in 2000, Žalgiris suffered one of its worse seasons. The club was eliminated after the group stage in the EuroLeague, finishing third in the NEBL and losing the LKL finals to Lietuvos Rytas for the first time. In the 2001 season, the team reached the new EuroLeague playoffs, but lost to AEK. Žalgiris regained the LKL championship, beating Lietuvos Rytas 3–2. The 2002 season was again disappointing, as the team was eliminated in the EuroLeague after the group stage and lost the LKL championship. In the 2003 season, they were again eliminated in the EuroLeague playoffs, but achieved the LKL championship, beating Lietuvos Rytas 4–2.

Sabonis became the principal owner of the club in 2003, after playing for many years in the Spanish ACB League and the North American National Basketball Association (NBA). He also came back to play for the club for the 2003–04 season. He dominated European competition winning EuroLeague Regular Season and Top 16 MVP. Žalgiris almost made it to the EuroLeague Final Four, but were stopped by Maccabi Tel Aviv, who tied the game on Derrick Sharp's last second three-pointer at the end of regulation and went on to lose in overtime.
The season ended in a high note, as Žalgiris swept Lietuvos Rytas 4–0 in the LKL championship.

2004–2009: Post-Sabonis era

After the departure of Sabonis at the conclusion of the 2004 season, Žalgiris faced a series of ups and downs. In the 2005 season, mainstays Tanoka Beard, Mindaugas Timinskas, Dainius Šalenga and new addition Robert Pack, enabled Žalgiris to have a respectable season. In the EuroLeague, Žalgiris finished the regular season with an 8–6 record, including wins on the road against heavy favorites Maccabi Tel Aviv and FC Barcelona. However, in the Top 16 phase, Žalgiris entered a long slump and finished with an 0–6 record. Žalgiris recovered on the domestic front, easily defeating ULEB Cup winner Lietuvos Rytas in the LKL finals with a 4–0 sweep, and also won the inaugural Baltic Basketball League (BBL) championship, beating Lietuvos Rytas in the finals 64–60.

In the 2006 season, the team suffered many changes. Mindaugas Timinskas, Dainius Šalenga and Robert Pack all departed the team, and Žalgiris built a younger team while signing Ed Cota to return. With the emergence of Darjuš Lavrinovič, and strong teamwork, Žalgiris started the season very solidly, finishing the EuroLeague regular season with a 9–5 record. Off-court, Žalgiris had many issues, resulting in a huge slump for the team, ending the Top 16 phase with another 0–6 record and losing both the LKL and BBL titles to Lietuvos Rytas. The lone bright spot became the play of emerging point guard Mantas Kalnietis, who was signed both as a replacement for the released Cota and due to very poor play from new point guard and longtime NBA player Kenny Anderson.

For the 2007 season they had a new coach, Ainars Bagatskis, but suffered a fiasco in the EuroLeague regular season, with a disastrous 2–12 record. After Ainars Bagatskis was replaced by assistant coach Rimantas Grigas and the signing of new point guard DeJuan Collins, Žalgiris won the newly established LKF Cup by beating Lietuvos Rytas. After also signing center Loren Woods, Žalgiris beat Lietuvos Rytas in the LKL finals.

Before the 2008 season, Žalgiris signed longtime EuroLeague player Marcus Brown. Žalgiris also played against NBA teams for the first time. The team had a successful regular season in the EuroLeague, finishing with an 8–6 record, but suffered another disappointment in the Top16, finishing with a 1–5 record. Žalgiris also won the LKF Cup for the second year in a row, beating Lietuvos Rytas 83–72 in the finals, after a monster game by Collins. In the BBL finals, Žalgiris defeated Lietuvos Rytas 86–84 in the finals on a last-second shot by Collins. Žalgiris retained the LKL title, beating Lietuvos Rytas 4–1 in the LKL finals in which Brown was named MVP.

The 2009 season started on a very high note, with the resignation of Jonas Mačiulis and Loren Woods, retaining leader Marcus Brown and signing of new point guard Willie Deane, who replaced the departed DeJuan Collins. However, financial difficulties lead to poor play from the team and the firing of coach Grigas, who was replaced by longtime player and assistant coach Gintaras Krapikas. Willie Deane was soon released, in large part due to his poor performance in the EuroLeague, which led to a seven-game losing streak. The team recovered under point guard Mantas Kalnietis, and finished the EuroLeague regular season with a 2–8 record, missing the Top 16. Despite growing financial difficulties, and the departure of Loren Woods, the team made the LKL and BBL finals, as well as the LKF Cup finals. Despite this, this was the most Žalgiris could accomplish, as they lost to Lietuvos Rytas. Jonas Mačiulis, who became the team leader during the season, left after the season ended.

2009–2013: Vladimir Romanov era

During the 2009 season Žalgiris was facing significant financial difficulties and sought a new investor. In 2009, Sabonis sold most of his stake to the local Ūkio banko investment group (ŪBIG), headed by Vladimir Romanov, who then held a 75% stake in the club. Sabonis retained a 21.5% interest in the club; 3% was owned by a minority group, while the remaining 0.5% was owned by the Kaunas City municipality.

In the 2010 season, Romanov soon became unpopular with Žalgiris fans. After the departures of Jonas Mačiulis and Paulius Jankūnas, the team extended the contract of Marcus Brown and also signed Martynas Pocius, who quickly became one of the best players for the team. The team also re-signed point guard Mantas Kalnietis, who turned down an offer from Benneton Treviso. The team started the season by winning the new BBL Cup against Lietuvos Rytas. However, subsequent poor performances led to head coach Krapikas being replaced by former Lithuanian National team coach Ramūnas Butautas, who lead the team to the EuroLeague Top 16 phase with a 3–7 regular season record. After the team entered a slump, Romanov controversially fired Butautas, replacing him with assistant coach and former captain Darius Maskoliūnas. Under Maskoliūnas, Žalgiris came its closest to the EuroLeague Top 8 phase, finishing with a 2–4 record. Žalgiris won back the BBL title by beating Lietuvos Rytas in the finals, but lost the LKL finals to Rytas by 4–3. Romanov had fired coach Maskoliūnas during this series, leading to speculation that Romanov had intentionally lost the finals to allow Lietuvos Rytas to qualify for the EuroLeague season. The season is widely considered the most controversial in club history.

Before the 2011 season, Žalgiris re-signed Paulius Jankūnas and DeJuan Collins, and also signed a Serbian coach Aleksandar Petrović as the new head coach for the team and Tomas Delininkaitis as shooting guard. The season began with Žalgiris playing very strongly, but after a slump in form Romanov fired head coach Petrović. They qualified to the Top 16 phase only in the final games, with a 5–5 record. After a controversial departure from center Mirza Begić, the slump continued under new coach Ilias Zouros, with a poor 1–5 record in the Top 16 phase and the VTB United League (not qualifying to the Final Four). However, the losses motivated the team, and after the recovery of Marcus Brown (who was injured for most of the season), Žalgiris won back the LKF Cup from Lietuvos Rytas and defeated VEF Riga in the BBL finals. In the LKL finals, Žalgiris easily defeated Lietuvos Rytas 4–1, regaining the LKL title for the first time since 2008.

Due to the NBA lockout, for the 2012 season, the team signed Sonny Weems and former Denver Nuggets point guard Ty Lawson. The team also re-signed long time fan-favorite Marko Popović. The team also signed longtime Lietuvos Rytas player and former Lithuanian National team captain Robertas Javtokas as center. However, the season started very poorly for Žalgiris. Hoping to end the slump, Romanov fired coach Ilias Zouros and replaced him with former Lietuvos Rytas head coach Aleksandar Trifunović. Despite initial improvement, with the team finishing the EuroLeague regular season with a 4–6 record and a trip to the Top 16, the slump continued in the Top 16, with the team ending the EuroLeague season with 0–6 record. After Ty Lawson left the team, Mantas Kalnietis became a true leader for Žalgiris, and played his perhaps best season. The team slowly recovered, winning the LKF Cup. After being eliminated in the VTB playoffs, Žalgiris made the BBL Final Four, winning against Lietuvos Rytas in the finals despite losing leader Sonny Weems (who was released due to injury) and DeJuan Collins (who was released due to failing a drug test). With very solid play from Marko Popovič and Tomas Delininkaitis, Žalgiris retained the LKL title, defeating Lietuvos Rytas in the finals 4–1. The club had achieved a second consecutive 'triple crown' of Lithuanian League, Lithuanian Cup and Baltic Cup.

For the 2013 season, Žalgiris signed Lithuanian national team players Rimantas Kaukėnas, Darjuš Lavrinovič and Kšyštof Lavrinovič, Unicaja Malaga star Tremmell Darden, and Oliver Lafayette at point guard. The season began by winning the newly established LKF SuperCup against Lietuvos Rytas. During the season, Mantas Kalnietis left the team and was replaced by Ibrahim Jaaber. Under new coach Joan Plaza, Žalgiris had their best EuroLeague start with five consecutive wins. Žalgiris finished at the top of the group for the first time in 13 years, with an 8–2 record. Žalgiris won the LKL and the 3rd place in VTB League. In their 76–66 home victory against CSKA Moscow, Žalgiris broke their attendance record, with 15,812 spectators. Following the collapse of Ūkio bankas, owner Vladimir Romanov left Žalgiris. Financial troubles returned to the club, and Tremmell Darden and Ibrahim Jabber departed. Paulius Motiejunas was named the team director on 20 March. Žalgiris finished the Top 16 with a 6–8 record, the best in club history. Žalgiris also won the group stage in the VTB United League. In May, Žalgiris won their third straight LKL title, sweeping Lietuvos Rytas 4–0 in the finals.

2013–2016: A new direction and continued domination of the LKL

After winning the LKL title, Žalgiris competed in the VTB United League playoffs, defeating Nizhny Novgorod in the quarterfinals but losing to Lokomotiv Kuban in the semi-finals. Despite the loss, Žalgiris was awarded the bronze medal for the first time since 2010. After losing head coach Joan Plaza, Žalgiris rehired Ilias Zouros as head coach for the 2014 season. Žalgiris left the VTB United League because of the changes in the EuroLeague format, which meant that the teams that didn't qualify for the Top 16 would have a chance to play in the EuroCup playoffs.

Žalgiris signed Justin Dentmon and Šarūnas Jasikevičius to one-year deals. After a very slow start to the season, Zouros was fired as head coach, replaced by Saulius Štombergas. Žalgiris made the Top 16 for the fifth consecutive time (with a 5–5 record). However, Žalgiris began to struggle in the LKL. The Top 16 proved to be a difficult stage, with Žalgiris losing many games by 5 points or less (a 2–12 record overall). After a few losses in the LKF Cup and the LKL, Štombergas resigned and was replaced by Gintaras Krapikas as interim head coach. In the last week of Top 16 play at home, Žalgiris beat Spanish champions Real Madrid. Justin Dentmon scored 36 points in that game, the most by a Žalgiris player in modern EuroLeague, and Dentmon also made 74 three-pointers during the season (a EuroLeague record since 2000).

After a loss to Lietuvos rytas in the final regular LKL season game, Žalgiris entered the playoffs as the fourth seed, the worst in club history. They faced Lietuvos rytas again in the semi-finals – the first time in 15 years that they did not meet in the final round. Žalgiris advanced to the finals against Neptūnas Klaipėda, taking the series 4–2 and winning their fourth consecutive LKL championship.

During the 2015 preseason, Žalgiris made significant changes for the squad, replacing Justin Dentmon with Maalik Wayns, who was in turn replaced by Will Cherry. Žalgiris also signed Darius Songaila from rivals Lietuvos Rytas and James Anderson from the NBA. Šarūnas Jasikevičius retired and became an assistant coach, and more young players were brought to the team. Young point guard Lukas Lekavičius was the main bright spot as the team began the LKL. In the EuroLeague, a 5–5 record qualified Žalgiris to the Top 16 phase where the team finished with a 5–9 record. In February, Žalgiris won the LKF Cup for the first time in three years. Žalgiris finished the LKL regular season in dominating fashion, with 12 straight wins, taking the top seed, and defeated Lietuvos rytas in the finals 4–0. This win was the club's fifth consecutive LKL title and their 17th overall.

Žalgiris had a total of seven players who competed in EuroBasket 2015. Žalgiris finished the off-season by signing Ian Vougioukas at center.

Žalgiris finished the 2016 regular season with a 5–5 record and qualified for the Top 16 phase for the seventh consecutive season. After a poor start to the Top 16, head coach Krapikas was replaced by Šarūnas Jasikevičius, but injuries to Javtokas and the departure of Kalnietis lead the team to a huge slump, and a loss to Lietuvos Rytas in the King Mindaugas Cup final. After strong criticism of the team management for not finding a center to replace Javtokas, Žalgiris signed new point guard Jerome Randle. While the EuroLeague season ended with a 2–12 record, a hugely disappointing result, the team later recovered, finishing in 1st place in the LKL regular season, over Cup winners Lietuvos Rytas. Žalgiris defeated Neptūnas Klaipėda with a 4–1 record in the LKL finals, winning a sixth consecutive LKL title.

2016–present: Žalgiris in the new EuroLeague format

2015-16

In November 2015, a conflict between FIBA and Euroleague emerged. FIBA (International Basketball Federation) announced the formation of the Basketball Champions League, and courted EuroLeague teams to their side. However, the top teams, the A-license teams including Žalgiris, decided to sign a ten-year contract with the Euroleague Basketball Company.

2016–17

Žalgiris's preparation for the 2016–17 season began during the 2016 LKL finals, when the club signed point guard Léo Westermann to replace the departing Jerome Randle. After the season, Pocius, Hanlan, Vougioukas, and long-time Žalgiris players Siim-Sander Vene and Kaspars Vecvagars, all left the team, while Žalgiris chose to retain the services of Seibutis and Motum. Žalgiris also re-signed Edgaras Ulanovas. Head coach Jasikevičius was pursued by FC Barcelona Lassa, but decided to remain with Žalgiris. To correct the previous season's lack of a good shooter, Žalgiris signed Kevin Pangos; the team was loaned Augusto Lima from Real Madrid to replace Vougioukas at center. Žalgiris also signed the returning Artūras Milaknis to a 3-year deal. German prospect Isaiah Hartenstein was scheduled to make his professional debut after being signed in the previous season. In August, Žalgiris signed Antanas Kavaliauskas, the captain of Lietuvos Rytas who had previously promised to never play for Žalgiris; Kavaliauskas apologized to fans after the signing was announced.

In February, Žalgiris won the first title of the 2016–17 season, winning the King Mindaugas Cup by defeating Neptūnas in the first round 81–58, Vytautas Prienai-Birštonas in the semi-finals 76–55, and Lietkabelis Panevėžys in the finals 84–63. Edgaras Ulanovas won the tournament MVP. In the EuroLeague, Žalgiris exceeded expectations with a 10th-place finish (14–16 record), scoring a win against defending champion CSKA Moscow and finishing ahead of FC Barcelona Lassa and Maccabi Tel Aviv. Players Brock Motum, Léo Westermann, Edgaras Ulanovas and Lukas Lekavičius developed strongly, and team captain Paulius Jankūnas played one of his best seasons of his career, leading the team in scoring and rebounding. Žalgiris easily finished in first place during the LKL regular season with just a few losses, swept rival Lietuvos rytas, with toughest competition from a powerful Lietkabelis team which included former Žalgiris leaders Darjuš and Kšyštof Lavrinovič. In the LKL playoffs, Žalgiris beat Dzūkija Alytus in the quarterfinals 3–0, beat Neptūnas 3–1 in the semi-finals. They faced Lietkabelis Panevėžys again in the LKL finals, winning the series 4–1, their seventh consecutive LKL championship. The 2016–17 season is considered one of the best in modern Žalgiris history.

2017–18

Prior the 2017–18 season, Žalgiris reached an agreement with club sponsor Avia Solutions Group to guarantee private flights for the team during away games in a refurbished business-class Boeing 737. The off-season work began just a week after winning the LKL championship, when breakout player Brock Motum signing with Anadolu Efes S.K. To replace Motum, Žalgiris signed Aaron White, who had played a season with Zenit Saint Petersburg. Léo Westerman signed with CSKA Moscow, and was replaced by talented guard Vasilije Micić. To replace Seibutis, Žalgiris originally signed Royce O'Neale, who terminated his deal just weeks later to sign with the Utah Jazz. Žalgiris then signed Axel Toupane to replace him. Because center Robertas Javtokas announced retirement and the loan of Augusto Lima ended, Žalgiris signed Brandon Davies of AS Monaco Basket in the center position. The most-shocking departure came at the end of June, when breakout point guard Lukas Lekavičius signed a contract with Panathinaikos. Needing a new point guard, Žalgiris signed Dee Bost, also of AS Monaco. Coach Jasikevičius also re-signed with Žalgiris, while the retired Javtokas became the new sports director of the team. On September 22, Žalgiris played a game in London against Polski Cukier Toruń, which Žalgiris won 87–61. Žalgiris won the King Mindaugas Cup for the second year in a row, defeating Lietuvos rytas 81–62 in the finals. Edgaras Ulanovas won the tournament MVP for the second straight year.

In the 2017–18 EuroLeague, Žalgiris was again projected to be one of the last teams. During October–December, Žalgiris struggled with a 5–5 record, before winning a five-game streak to finish the first round 10–5, tied for third place in the standings. In the second round, Dee Bost was replaced by Beno Udrih. Žalgiris struggled for the first few weeks of the second round, but fought its way to an 18–12 record (sixth place) and qualified to the EuroLeague playoffs for the first time since 2001. The team qualified for the 2018 EuroLeague Final Four after beating Olympiacos in game 4 to clinch a 3–1 series win. The team achieved this despite having the second-lowest budget in the league. Žalgiris lost to Fenerbahçe in the semifinals, 76–67. In the third-place game, Žalgiris faced longtime rivals CSKA Moscow; Žalgiris lead by as much as 24 points, but CSKA rallied and Žalgiris narrowly won 79–77, achieving third place in the Euroleague. In the LKL, Žalgiris won the regular season, and beat Lietuvos rytas in the finals with a 4–1 record, earning their eighth consecutive LKL championship. This was the club's best season since 1999.

After a near-perfect season, the off-season was difficult. Žalgiris lost its front court as Pangos went to FC Barcelona Lassa and Micič signed with Efes. Žalgiris signed Nate Wolters as the team's new point guard. After the departure of Beno Udrih, Žalgiris signed Donatas Sabeckis from Šiauliai, who lead the LKL in assists. Toupane left the team to sign with Olympiacos; to replace him, Žalgiris signed former-teammate Marius Grigonis, who was having a successful career abroad, to a multi-year deal, as well as talented guard/forward Thomas Walkup. At center, Davies had re-signed in April, and Kavaliauskas was re-signed in June. To replace reserve Martynas Sajus, Žalgiris signed Laurynas Birutis, who was loaned and had a successful season with Šiauliai. Several more reserves, Paulius Valinskas and Gytis Masiulis, were loaned to other LKL teams so that they could gain more playing time. Ulanovas also signed a new contract. Like the previous season, the biggest concern was the future of coach Jasikevičius. Despite offers from other EuroLeague teams and the Toronto Raptors, Jasikevičius remained with Žalgiris, signing a new contract. Former player Tomas Masiulis replaced Darius Songaila in the coaching staff. In September, Žalgiris signed the returning Léo Westermann to fill the point guard spot.

2018-19

Žalgiris struggled at the start of the 2018–19 EuroLeague season. Needing another point guard, Žalgiris signed Derrick Walton in October. By December, led by Westermann, Davies, Grigonis and White, Žalgiris reached sixth place with a 7–7 record. However, injuries decimated the team, leaving a void in the point guard position. Walton's disappointing play led to declining minutes, and a release in February 2019. Deon Thompson was signed in January to strengthen the front court. In February, Žalgiris suffered a fiasco in the King Mindaugas Cup to Rytas Vilnius, losing the tournament for the first time since 2016. By the start of March, Žalgiris was 13th with a 9–15 record, with minimal hopes of reaching the playoffs. Despite this, and a poor home record, Žalgiris led EuroLeague attendance by a large margin. The team's play started to improve when Walkup was pushed to the point guard position to replace Walton, Westermann returned after injury and improving play by Thompson led to a six-game winning streak, achieving a 15–15 record and the final spot in the playoffs. In the EuroLeague playoffs, Žalgiris lost to Fenerbahçe. Žalgiris broke the EuroLeague's home attendance record with an average of 14,808 spectators in the Žalgiris Arena. In the 2018–19 LKL season, Žalgiris finished in first place in the regular season, and swept the series finals against Rytas, winning the series 3–0, for a ninth consecutive LKL championship.

2019–20

During the off-season, White, Davies, Wolters, Westermann and Thompson left, while Kavaliauskas announced retirement. Little used guard Sabeckis was also not re-signed. Lukas Lekavičius returned to the team after two seasons in Greece, and Alex Pérez was signed to replace Westermann. Jock Landale was signed to replace Davies, while Nigel Hayes was signed to replace White. Zach LeDay of Olympiacos was signed to complete the front court. Martinas Geben, signed to a long-term deal the previous summer, earned a spot on the roster after a successful season in Juventus Utena in the LKL, where he was named Season MVP. Grigonis, who had a great season, was resigned to new contract. Coach Jasikevičius remained with the team for one more season. Pérez, however, spent just a few months with Žalgiris, and was released in November due to his weak play, with Walkup taking his point-guard position. Žalgiris also signed shooting-guard K. C. Rivers in November.

Žalgiris won the King Mindaugas Cup where they beat Rytas Vilnius 80–60 in the finals. Ulanovas was named the MVP of the tournament, his fourth MVP award in Lithuanian Cup competitions. Due to the COVID-19 outbreak, the 2019–20 LKL season was ended prematurely, and with Žalgiris firmly leading the standings, Žalgiris was announced as champions, winning their 10th consecutive LKL championship. In the 2019–20 EuroLeague, Žalgiris struggled for most of the season, including plummeting to the end of the standings, but recovered by February 2020. With the EuroLeague season stopped due to the COVID-19 outbreak, Žalgiris finished in ninth place.

2020–21

With the season ending very early due to the COVID-19 situation, Žalgiris started their off-season work early. LeDay, Landale, Ulanovas, Rivers all left the team during the summer, but the biggest departure was of coach Jasikevičius, who left Žalgiris and signed with FC Barcelona in July. With the rest of the coaching staff following Jasikevičius to Barcelona, Žalgiris was forced to look for a new head coach. On July 14, Žalgiris announced the signing of Martin Schiller as the team's new head coach. Schiller had previously worked with the NBA G League team Salt Lake City Stars, and was named the NBA G League Coach of the Year for the 2019–20 season. Schiller brought in Arne Woltmann and Tautvydas Sabonis as his assistant coaches, with Evaldas Beržininkaitis being the only person remaining on the team from Jasikevičius old staff, as an assistant coach. Žalgiris signed Steve Vasturia and the returning Tomas Dimša as the new guards. Patricio Garino replaced Ulanovas, while Joffrey Lauvergne and Augustine Rubit replaced LeDay and Landale. The most surprising signing happened in June, as Žalgiris bought out Marek Blaževič, a talented prospect, out of rivals Rytas Vilnius. Grigonis, Lekavičius, Walkup, Jankūnas, Geben, Hayes, and Milaknis remained with the team.

While the expectations for the season were not promising, under Schiller, Žalgiris surprised everyone, fighting up until the end of the 2020–21 EuroLeague season for a playoff berth, thanks to strong play from Marius Grigonis. Other players, like Walkup and Hayes, and the young Rokas Jokubaitis, played their best seasons with Žalgiris. Despite not making the playoffs, Žalgiris finished the Euroleague season with a respectable 17–17 record. Žalgiris won the King Mindaugas Cup and also won the 11th consecutive LKL final by beating Rytas in the finals 3–0.

2021–22

Since a lot of players from last year left (Thomas Walkup, Nigel Hayes, Patricio Garino, Martinas Geben, Augustine Rubit, Rokas Jokubaitis, Marius Grigonis and Steve Vasturia), Žalgiris had to make a lot of moves in the off season. They loaned Tomas Dimša to De' Longhi Treviso and Paulius Murauskas to Kėdainių Nevėžis. They signed Tyler Cavanaugh, Niels Giffey, Mantas Kalnietis, Josh Nebo, Edgaras Ulanovas, Jānis Strēlnieks and Emmanuel Mudiay. They also extended the contract with Lukas Lekavičius (1+1). On paper, the team looked good. However, the performance on the court disappointed even the biggest of fans. 
Žalgiris lost all five pre-season games, playing seemingly worse each game. In the LKL, Žalgiris had one of the most difficult starts ever - while winning all three games, Žalgiris struggled even against the weakest of teams. After a 0–2 start in the Euroleague, Žalgiris fired coach Martin Schiller, replacing him with Jure Zdovc. Under Zdovc, things didn't really improve. Injuries to players like Lauvergne, Strelnieks, struggles even in the LKL, disappointing play from projected leaders like Mudiay resulted in the worst start ever for Žalgiris - an 0–9 start in the Euroleague. In the LKL, a loss to BC Rytas resulted in Žalgiris actually falling out of first place in the LKL. By November, Žalgiris released Mudiay, replacing him with point guard Tai Webster and also signed shooting guard Zoran Dragič. The moves backfired for Žalgiris - Webster struggled even in the LKL, and had a disappointing season in the Euroleague, while Dragič rarely saw playing time and was released by the end of the year. New signees like Regimantas Miniotas also saw limited playing time. Losses in the Euroleague resulted even in fans turning on the team and Žalgiris attendance fell to record lows. By February, Žalgiris, having suffered another 9 game losing streak, was in last 18th place with a disastrous 4–20 record. By March, Žalgiris largely started recovering, in particular thanks to the return of Joffrey Lauvergne from injury - including wins over Real Madrid and FC Barcelona at home in the Euroleague. Žalgiris also won the 2022 King Mindaugas Cup, beating BC Lietkabelis 91-66 in the finals, and was also the first team to refuse to play against Russian teams in the Euroleague (CSKA Moscow, Kazan Unics and Zenit St.Petersburg) due to the Russian invasion to Ukraine, even getting criticism in the Russian press for being one of the reasons Russian teams got disqualified from the Euroleague. Žalgiris finished the Euroleague season with a memorable win against KK Crvena zvezda 103–98 at home, in what was the last Euroleague game from Paulius Jankūnas. Žalgiris finished the Euroleague with an 8–20 record - 15th place, above the disqualified CSKA, UNICS and Zenit, but still in last place - worst Euroleague finish since the 2015–2016 season.  By the start of April, disappointment returned to Žalgiris - struggles even in the LKL resulted in Žalgiris once again falling behind Rytas in the standings, and finished behind Rytas in the LKL standings for the first time since the 2013–2014 season. In April, Žalgiris made a decision to replace Zdovc, with Žalgiris signing Lithuanian national basketball team coach Kazys Maksvytis as head coach. The decision proved to be disastrous for Žalgiris - under Maksvytis, the team struggled, and coach Maksvytis had failed to find a good rotation or lineup with the existing roster. In the LKL playoffs, the struggles became even more evident - Žalgiris needed all five games to beat BC Neptūnas in the quarterfinals, narrowly winning the series 3-2. In the semifinals, Žalgiris faced BC Lietkabelis - Žalgiris won the first game, before losing the next three games - for the first time in history, Žalgiris failed to qualify to the LKL finals, losing the series 1-3, ending their 11 year domination of the LKL, and suffering the biggest fiasco in club history. To add more insult, BC Rytas went on to win the LKL championship. Fan support plummeted and even resulted in boycotts (which ended early due to the retirement of Paulius Jankūnas). Žalgiris finished the season by winning the LKL bronze medals, beating BC Šiauliai. Paulius Jankūnas retired after the season, and became the sports director of Žalgiris, having a lot of work after what became the worst season of the team since the independence of Lithuania in 1990.

Players

Retired numbers

Current roster

Depth chart

Squad changes for the 2022–2023 season

Players in

|}

Players out

|}

Players out on loan

|}

Honours

Domestic competitions
Lithuanian Championship
 Winners (11): 1946, 1950, 1952, 1953, 1954, 1955, 1957, 1958, 1991, 1992, 1993
Lithuanian League
 Winners (23): 1994, 1995, 1996, 1997, 1998, 1999, 2001, 2003, 2004, 2005, 2007, 2008, 2011, 2012, 2013, 2014, 2015, 2016, 2017, 2018, 2019, 2020, 2021
Lithuanian Cup
 Winners (6): 1990, 2007, 2008, 2011, 2012, 2015
Soviet Union League
 Winners (5): 1947, 1951, 1985, 1986, 1987
Soviet Union Cup
 Winners (1): 1953
King Mindaugas Cup
 Winners (5): 2017, 2018, 2020, 2021, 2022

European competitions

EuroLeague
 Winners (1): 1998–99
 Runners-up (1): 1985–86
 Semifinalists (1): 1986–87
 3rd place (1): 2017–18
 Final Four (2): 1999, 2018
FIBA Saporta Cup
 Winners (1): 1997–98
 Runners-up (1): 1984–85
 Semifinalists (3): 1988–89, 1989–90, 1995–96

Worldwide competitions
FIBA Intercontinental Cup
 Winners (1): 1986

Regional competitions
NEBL Championship
 Winners (1): 1999
BBL Championship
 Winners (5): 2005, 2008, 2010, 2011, 2012
BBL Cup
 Winners (1): 2009

Other competitions
 Gomelsky Cup
 Winners (1): 2008
 Runners-up (1): 2010

Gloria Cup
 Winners (2): 2017, 2018

Torneo Città di Caorle
 Winners (1): 2016

Titans Trophy
 Winners (1): 2018

Kaunas, Lithuania Invitational Game
 Winners (1): 2019

Season-by-season
The LKF Cup was replaced by the King Mindaugas Cup, in 2016. 
Scroll down to see more.

Detailed information of former rosters and results.

Notable players

 Vytautas Kulakauskas (1944–1949)
 Stepas Butautas (1947–1956)
 Justinas Lagunavičius (1945–1954)
 Vincas Sercevičius (1944–1945, 1946–1951)
 Kazimieras Petkevičius (1947–1954, 1958–1963)
 Stanislovas Stonkus (1950–1958)
 Arūnas Lauritėnas (1952–1962)
 Henrikas Giedraitis (1957–1972)
 Romualdas Venzbergas (1962–1975)
 Modestas Paulauskas (1962–1976)
 Algirdas Linkevičius (1968–1982)
 Vitoldas Masalskis (1972–1985)
 Sergejus Jovaiša (1972–1989)
 Raimundas Čivilis (1977–1988)
 Valdemaras Chomičius (1978–1989)
 Gintaras Krapikas (1981–1990)
 Arvydas Sabonis (1981–1989, 2001–2002, 2003–2005)
 Algirdas Brazys (1982–1991, 1992–1995)
 Rimas Kurtinaitis (1983–1989, 1992, 1995–1996)
 Arūnas Visockas (1985–1990, 1992–1996)
 Gvidonas Markevičius (1986–1990)
 Romanas Brazdauskis (1987–1990, 1993–1994)
 Gintaras Einikis (1987–1995, 2002–2003)
 Darius Lukminas (1989–1996)
 Darius Dimavičius (1989–1991)
 Saulius Štombergas (1991–1993, 1997–1999, 2002–2003)
 Darius Maskoliūnas (1992–1999)
 Tomas Masiulis (1995–2002, 2008)
 Darius Sirtautas (1995–1998)
 Dainius Adomaitis (1996–1999)
 Eurelijus Žukauskas (1997–2000, 2007–2009)
 Virginijus Praškevičius (1997–1998)
 Mindaugas Žukauskas (1997–2000)
 Giedrius Gustas (1998–1999, 2000–2004)
 Donatas Slanina (1999–2002)
 Andrius Jurkūnas (2000–2001)
 Mindaugas Timinskas (1999–2000, 2002–2005)
 Dainius Šalenga (2000–2005, 2007–2012)
 Tadas Klimavičius (2002–2003, 2008–2014)
 Darjuš Lavrinovič (2003–2006, 2012–2013)
 Paulius Jankūnas (2003–2009, 2010–present)
 Martynas Andriuškevičius (2004–2005)
 Jonas Mačiulis (2005–2009)
 Mantas Kalnietis (2006–2012, 2015–2016, 2021–present)
 Artūras Milaknis (2007–2008, 2008–2011, 2013–2015, 2016–present)
 Donatas Motiejūnas (2007–2008)
 Adas Juškevičius (2009–2010, 2012–2013)
 Martynas Pocius (2009–2011, 2013–2014, 2015–2016)
 Mindaugas Kuzminskas (2010–2013)
 Tomas Delininkaitis (2010–2012)
 Robertas Javtokas (2011–2017)
 Kšyštof Lavrinovič (2012–2014)
 Rimantas Kaukėnas (2012–2013)
 Artūras Gudaitis (2013–2015)
 Šarūnas Jasikevičius (2013–2014)
 Darius Songaila (2014–2015)
 Edgaras Ulanovas (2014–2020, 2021–present)
 Gytis Masiulis (2014-2020)
 Lukas Lekavičius (2014–2017, 2019–present)
 Renaldas Seibutis (2015–2017)
 Gert Kullamäe (1993–1994)
 Torgeir Bryn (1995–1996)
 Franjo Arapović (1996–1998)
 Veljko Mršić (1996–1997)
 Ennis Whatley (1997–1998)
 Anthony Bowie (1998–1999)
 Tyus Edney (1998–1999)
 George Zidek (1998–2000)
 Grigorij Khizhnyak (2000–2002)
 Steve Woodberry (2000–2002)
 Sherman Hamilton (2001–2002)
 Ed Cota (2002–2004, 2005–2006)
 Kornél Dávid (2002–2003)
 Ainārs Bagatskis (2003–2005)
 Tanoka Beard (2003–2008)
 Miroslav Berić (2003–2004)
 Robert Pack (2004–2005)
 Kenny Anderson (2005–2006)
 Larry Ayuso (2005–2006)
 Reggie Freeman (2005–2006)
 DeJuan Collins (2006–2008; 2010–2012)
 Marcelo Machado (2006–2007)
 Hanno Möttölä (2006–2007)
 Kirk Penney (2006–2007)
 Marko Popović (2006–2008, 2011–2013)
 Marcus Brown (2007–2008, 2009–2011)
 Goran Jurak (2007–2008)
 Damir Markota (2007–2008)
 Mamadou N'Diaye (2007–2008)
 Loren Woods (2007, 2008–2009)
 Siim-Sander Vene  (2009, 2013–2016)
 Mirza Begić (2009–2010)
 Travis Watson (2009–2011)
 Ty Lawson (2011)
 Boban Marjanović (2011)
 Milovan Raković (2011–2012)
 Sonny Weems (2011–2012)
 Tremmell Darden (2012–2013)
 Oliver Lafayette (2012–2013)
 Justin Dentmon (2013–2014)
 James Anderson (2014–2015)
 Brock Motum (2015–2017)
 Ian Vougioukas (2015–2016)
 Augusto Lima (2016–2017)
  Jerome Randle (2016)
 Léo Westermann (2016–2017, 2018–2019) 
 Kevin Pangos (2016–2018)
 Brandon Davies (2017–2019)
 Vasilije Micić (2017–2018)
 Beno Udrih (2018)
 Jock Landale (2019–2020)

Head coaches

  Mykolas Ziminskas: 1944–1946
  Vytautas Kulakauskas: 1946
  Mykolas Ziminskas: 1947–1948
  Janis Grinbergas: 1949
  Valerijus Griešnovas: 1950
  Vincas Sercevičius: 1952
  Vytautas Kulakauskas: 1952
  Vincas Sercevičius: 1953–1956
  Valerijus Griešnovas: 1957–1958
  Kazimieras Petkevičius: 1959–1962
  Vytautas Bimba: 1962–1975
  Stepas Butautas: 1975–1978, 1979
  Algimantas Rakauskas: 1978–1979
  Vladas Garastas: 1979–1989
  Henrikas Giedraitis: 1989–1990
  Raimundas Sargūnas: 1990–1991
  Modestas Paulauskas: 1991–1992
  Henrikas Giedraitis: 1992–1993
  Jaak Salumets: 1993–1994
  Jonas Kazlauskas: 1994–2000
  Algirdas Brazys: 2000–2002
  Antanas Sireika: 2002–2006
  Ainars Bagatskis: 2006
  Rimantas Grigas: 2006–2008, 2010–2011
  Gintaras Krapikas: 2008–2009, 2014–2016
  Ramūnas Butautas: 2009–2010
  Darius Maskoliūnas: 2010
  Marcus Brown: 2010
  Aleksandar Petrović: 2010
  Rimantas Grigas: 2010–2011
  Ilias Zouros: 2011, 2013
  Vitoldas Masalskis: 2011
  Aleksandar Trifunović: 2011–2012
  Joan Plaza: 2012–2013
  Ilias Zouros: 2013
  Saulius Štombergas: 2013–2014
  Gintaras Krapikas: 2014–2016
  Šarūnas Jasikevičius: 2016–2020
  Martin Schiller: 2020–2021
  Jure Zdovc: 2021–2022 
  Kazys Maksvytis: 2022–present

Attendance 
Žalgiris Euroleague attendance year by year in Žalgirio Arena.

* Position by average attendance among Euroleague teams

Notes
1.Only Top 16 matches were played
2.Only three games played with spectators due to COVID-19 pandemic

NBA players that have played for Žalgiris

Team records 
LKL Records

Most points scored in a single game - 146 (vs LSU-Atletas, 2004-01-24)

Highest 2 pointers made percentage of all time - 57.08%

Most offensive rebounds of all time - 25330

Most three pointers made in a single game - 23 (vs LSU-Atletas, 2004-01-24)

Most points scored in a single half of a game - 87 (vs LSU-Atletas, 2004-01-24)

Most points scored in a single quarter of a game - 46 (vs LSU-Atletas, 2004-01-24)

Biggest win in a home game - by 82 points (vs LSU-Atletas, 2004-01-24)

Most consecutive wins of all time - 38 (1998-05-04 - 1999-11-08)

Most consecutive home wins of all time - 39 (2003-01-18 - 2004-10-15)

Most consecutive away wins of all time - 23 (1998-01-31 - 1999-11-08)

Best winning percentage of all time - 64%

Largest single game attendance of all time - 15,266 (vs Lietuvos Rytas, in the last game of the finals)

VTB United League Records

Fewest combined points in an overtime period - 8 – Žalgiris (6) – Triumph (2) (2012-10-14)

Fewest fouls in a single game - 7 (vs Lokomotiv Kuban, 2013-05-25)

Largest attendance at a game - 15,812 (vs CSKA, 2012-10-28)

Euroleague Records

Most combined points in regulation - 224 –  Skipper Bologna (117) against  Žalgiris Kaunas (107) (2004-01-22)

Fewest points in a quarter - 2 (vs Anadolu Efes, 2014-12-04)

Most blocks in a single game - 12 (vs Adecco Estudiantes, 2000-12-14; vs Asseco Prokom, 2008-12-18)

Most blocks per game in a season - 5,58 (2000-01 Euroleague season)

Baltic Basketball League Records

Most points scored in a single game - 125 (vs Barons/LU, 2005-01-08)

Most free throws made in a single game - 37 (vs Valmieras Piens, 2005-02-15)

Most free throws made of all time - 1468

Most blocks of all time - 303

Highest points per game of all time - 92,14

Highest efficiency per game of all time - 108,95

Highest three point percentage of all time - 40,22

Most blocks per game of all time - 3,94

Previous kits
The uniform colors of Žalgiris are green and white. The home games are played in green uniforms and the away games are played in white. Since 2012, Adidas was the manufacturer of the club uniforms. In 2018, Žalgiris started manufacturing their own uniforms, in attempt to spread the brand image of the team while also making them more affordable to fans.

Statistical leaders

All-time points per game in European games (PPG)
Only players with a significant number of games played or points scored.

Last updated: 2021-11-18.

Individual awards

LKL Most Valuable Player
Gintaras Einikis – 1994, 1995
Tanoka Beard – 2004, 2005, 2007
Darjuš Lavrinovič – 2006

LKL Finals MVP
Gintaras Einikis – 1994, 1995
Eurelijus Žukauskas – 2000
Tanoka Beard – 2004, 2007
Mindaugas Timinskas – 2005
Marcus Brown – 2008
Paulius Jankūnas – 2011, 2014
Tomas Delininkaitis – 2012
Mindaugas Kuzminskas – 2013
Artūras Milaknis – 2015
Jerome Randle – 2016
Edgaras Ulanovas – 2017, 2019
Brandon Davies – 2018
Thomas Walkup - 2021

King Mindaugas Cup Finals MVP
Edgaras Ulanovas – 2017, 2018, 2020
Joffrey Lauvergne – 2021, 2022
 
LKL Rising Star
Rokas Jokubaitis – 2021
Lukas Lekavičius - 2015

LKL Defensive Player of the Year
Thomas Walkup - 2019, 2021
Robertas Javtokas - 2015

LKL Most Improved Player
Edgaras Ulanovas - 2016
LKL Coach of the Year
Šarūnas Jasikevičius - 2017, 2018, 2019
All-LKL Team
James Anderson - 2015
Paulius Jankūnas - 2015, 2016, 2017
Edgaras Ulanovas - 2016, 2019
Lukas Lekavičius - 2017, 2022
Brandon Davies - 2018, 2019
Kevin Pangos - 2018
Marius Grigonis - 2019
Joffrey Lauvergne - 2021
LKL All-Star Game MVP
Rimas Kurtinaitis - 1996
Mindaugas Timinskas - 2000
Grigorij Khizhnyak - 2001
Tanoka Beard - 2004, 2005
Jonas Mačiulis - 2007
Kšyštof Lavrinovič - 2013
Darjuš Lavrinovič - 2013
Justin Dentmon - 2014
LKL Best Legionnaire
Kevin Pangos - 2018
LKL Moment of The Season
Marek Blaževič - 2021

EuroLeague MVP
Arvydas Sabonis – 2004

EuroLeague Final Four MVP
Tyus Edney – 1999

All-EuroLeague First Team
Arvydas Sabonis – 2004
Brandon Davies – 2019

All-EuroLeague Second Team
Tanoka Beard – 2005
Darjuš Lavrinovič – 2006
Kevin Pangos – 2018
Paulius Jankūnas – 2018

Rivalries

During the Soviet era, Žalgiris had a huge rivalry with CSKA Moscow, the multiple-time champions and Red Army symbol, drawing huge crowds in the 1950s, 1960s and 1970s. The rivalry peaked during the 1980s, with the teams meeting in the USSR championship finals six times, which Žalgiris won in 1985, 1986 and 1987. It is considered to be the top rivalry in USSR basketball. CSKA remains one of the most-hated teams in Kaunas to this day. During the 2000s and 2010s, the teams have met many times in the EuroLeague, with CSKA winning most of the matches. In 2018, during the match for third place, Žalgiris narrowly defeated CSKA, 79–77. Over the years, the two teams also met in the NEBL, as well as the VTB United League, with the matches drawing huge crowds. In 2012, one such VTB match drew a record attendance of 15,812 for the competition and for the Žalgirio Arena.

After the Act of the Re-Establishment of the State of Lithuania and the Independence of Lithuania in 1990, and the establishment of the Lithuanian Basketball League in 1993, Žalgiris had a derby rivalry with BC Atletas, coached by former-Žalgiris head coach Vladas Garastas, with both teams fighting for the LKL championship. The teams met in the LKL finals four times, with Žalgiris winning each time. Starting in 1998, the biggest rival of Žalgiris has been BC Lietuvos rytas, also known as BC Rytas, from Vilnius. The matches draw the biggest interest in all of LKL, with the teams meeting in the finals 17 times, with Žalgiris winning 12 times, while Rytas won 5. The teams constantly fight for first place in the standings, and also fought in the LKF Cup, King Mindaugas Cup, Baltic Basketball League finals and the NEBL, with Žalgiris winning most of the games. During the 2010s, Žalgiris has largely dominated the rivalry, with sweeps in the finals in 2012, 2013, 2015, 2019 and in the regular season in 2017. In the 2018–19 season, Žalgiris swept Rytas in both the regular season and the finals' series, making it one of only few times this has happened.

Matches against NBA teams

Video games
Žalgiris basketball club was featured in the video game NBA 2K14, along with thirteen other top EuroLeague teams.  The club was also featured in NBA 2K15, NBA 2K16 and NBA 2K17.

Notes

References

External links 

  
 BC Žalgiris at EuroLeague.net

BC Žalgiris
Basketball teams in Lithuania
Basketball teams in the Soviet Union
EuroLeague clubs
EuroLeague-winning clubs
Basketball in Kaunas
Basketball teams established in 1944